Puru Raaj Kumar (born 30 March 1970) is an Indian actor who works in Bollywood films. He is the son of actor Raaj Kumar and is married to Croatian model Koraljika Grdak.

Early life and education
Puru Raaj Kumar was born in Bombay, Maharashtra, India to a Kashmiri Pandit father, Raaj Kumar and Gayatri. He was a student of Gettysburg College where he majored in economics, psychology and theatre.

Career
Kumar's first film Bal Bramhachari which was released in 1996. In this film, popular actress Karisma Kapoor was his co-star. After four years he acted in Hamara Dil Aapke Paas Hai in 2000 where he played a negative role. His film Mission Kashmir was also released in 2000. Three of his films were released in 2001. These films were Khatron Ke Khiladi, Uljhan and Arjun Devaa. In 2002, four of his films were released. These films were Bharat Bhagya Vidhata, Vadh, Inth Ka Jawab Patthar and Dushmani. He then acted in LOC Kargil (2003). 

After several flops and disasters at the box office, Kumar was not able to establish a strong place in Bollywood. He acted in Jaago in 2004. After more than two years, his film Umrao Jaan was released in 2006. He then acted in Dosh in 2007. He was also a part of Veer which was released in 2010. His latest film is Action Jackson (2014) where he played the role of ACP Shirke.

Filmography

Personal life
Kumar married Croatian model, Koraljika Grdak on 14 October 2011 in Zagreb.

Controversy
On 17 December 1993, Kumar ran his car over eight people who were sleeping on a pavement in Bandra, Mumbai. Three people were killed through this accident. It is also said that he was drunk at that time and was arrested for this incident. Later, he was released. It is said that the matter was settled out of court and he had to pay fine for this incident.

References

External links
 

1970 births
Male actors from Mumbai
Male actors in Hindi cinema
Indian male film actors
Living people 
Gettysburg College alumni